Summerscale or Summerscales is a surname. Notable people with the surname include:

 Aaron Summerscale (born 1969), English chess player
 Bill Summerscales (born 1949), English footballer 
 Kate Summerscale (born 1965), English writer and journalist
 Laurretta Summerscales, British ballerina